Takrar (تکرار in Urdu) is a Pakistani television show aired on Express News that covers a variety of subjects that includes social issues and current affairs.

Imran Riaz Khan hosts this show. He was the first to report the Ramond Davis incident. Takrar airs from Monday to Wednesday at 8 P.M. PST.

Notable Programs:

 SSG (Pak Army) Special
 SSG (Pak Navy) Special
 Takrar Program on Siachen Glacier Battlefield
 Plight of Joseph Colony Residents (Lahore)
 Takrar Election 2013 Special program series
 Takrar Kalash Tribe Special Documentary
 Plight of Palestine Special Documentary
 Documentary on APS Martyrs
 with Anwar Masood Poet
 Lyari Crime History
 Dacoits of Interior Sindh

References 

Pakistani television series